The 1934 Colgate football team was an American football team that represented Colgate University as an independent during the 1934 college football season. In its sixth season under head coach Andrew Kerr, Colgate compiled a 7–1 record and outscored opponents by  a total of 188 to 38.

Schedule

References

Colgate
Colgate Raiders football seasons
Colgate Red Raiders football